State Route 185 (SR 185) is a short state route in the U.S. state of Maine. The route starts at Ocean Avenue in Sorrento and ends at U.S. Route 1 (US 1) in Sullivan.

Route description
SR 185 is the main route into the center of Sorrento. It begins east of the downtown area at the intersection of Ocean Avenue and Keasarge Avenue on the south side of the peninsula. The route heads northeast for one block until reaching a four-way intersection with Waukeag Avenue and Doanes Point Avenue. At West Shore Road, SR 185 heads east along East Side Road to cut across the Waukeag Neck peninsula to later parallel the shore of Flanders Bay. Through this area, the road passes a golf course and a church. Shortly after the northernmost intersection with West Shore Road, SR 185 ends at US 1 just past the Sorrento–Sullivan town line.

Junction list

References

External links

Floodgap Roadgap's RoadsAroundME: Maine State Route 185

185
Transportation in Hancock County, Maine